Quillayute Valley School District 402 (QVSD) is a school district headquartered in Forks, Washington.

Its schools are: Forks Elementary School, Forks Intermediate School, Forks Junior High School, and Forks High School. Forks Alternative School is the alternative campus.

References

External links
 Quillayute Valley School District
 Quillayute Valley School District (Archive)

Education in Clallam County, Washington
School districts in Washington (state)